Ad Lucem is an album by Swedish bassist and composer Anders Jormin recorded in 2011 and released on the ECM label.

Reception
The JazzTimes review by LLoyd Sachs observed "With its utterly distinctive chamber sound, Anders Jormin’s Ad Lucem is a certain winner this year in the Latin jazz category—no, not the Latin jazz played by Eddie Palmieri, but the considerably rarer kind featuring lyrics in the language of Caesar". All About Jazz stated "any new recording from Jormin proves well worth the wait and Ad Lucem is no exception".

Track listing
All compositions by Anders Jormin except as indicated
 "Hic et Nunc" - 6:55  
 "Quibus" - 6:05  
 "Clamor" - 5:39  
 "Vigor" (Anders Jormin, Erika Angell, Fredrik Ljungkvist, Jon Fält, Mariam Wallentin) - 2:50  
 "Inter Semper et Numquam Lyrics" (Anders Jormin, Pia Tafdrup) - 3:58  
 "Lignum" (Jon Fält) - 0:34  
 "Matutinum" - 4:20  
 "Vox Animæ" - 5:04  
 "Vesper Est" - 4:08  
 "Lux" - 6:22  
 "Cæruleus" - 5:10  
 "Matutinum – Clausula" - 1:02

Personnel
Anders Jormin — bass
Fredrik Ljungkvist — clarinet, bass clarinet, tenor saxophone
Jon Fält  — drums
Erika Angell, Mariam Wallentin  — voice

References

ECM Records albums
Anders Jormin albums
2012 albums
Albums produced by Manfred Eicher